Brent is a census-designated place (CDP) in Sequoyah County, Oklahoma, United States, south of Sallisaw. It is part of the Fort Smith, Arkansas-Oklahoma Metropolitan Statistical Area. The population was 504 at the 2000 census.

The post office opened May 6, 1896 and closed May 31, 1929.  It was located in District 11 of the old Indian Territory. Brent was named for the Brent Ferry on the nearby Arkansas River.

Geography
Brent is located at  (35.366510, -94.786501).

Government
The United States Coast Guard has an ANT (Aid-to-Navigations Team) station at the end of D1135 Road.

Demographics

As of the census of 2000, there were 504 people, 206 households, and 148 families residing in the CDP. There were 233 housing units at an average density of 20.9/sq mi (8.1/km2). The racial makeup of the CDP was 78.97% White, 0.60% African American, 14.48% Native American, 0.40% Asian, 0.60% from other races, and 4.96% from two or more races. Hispanic or Latino of any race were 0.60% of the population.

There were 206 households, out of which 31.6% had children under the age of 18 living with them, 64.1% were married couples living together, 6.8% had a female householder with no husband present, and 27.7% were non-families. 23.8% of all households were made up of individuals, and 8.7% had someone living alone who was 65 years of age or older. The average household size was 2.45 and the average family size was 2.93.

In the CDP, the population was spread out, with 23.8% under the age of 18, 7.5% from 18 to 24, 28.2% from 25 to 44, 26.8% from 45 to 64, and 13.7% who were 65 years of age or older. The median age was 38 years. For every 100 females, there were 109.1 males. For every 100 females age 18 and over, there were 106.5 males.

The median income for a household in the CDP was $24,141, and the median income for a family was $27,813. Males had a median income of $21,250 versus $16,042 for females. The per capita income for the CDP was $11,968. About 10.1% of families and 13.9% of the population were below the poverty line, including 5.5% of those under age 18 and 10.6% of those age 65 or over.

References

Further reading
 Shirk, George H.; Oklahoma Place Names; University of Oklahoma Press; Norman, Oklahoma; 1987: .

Census-designated places in Sequoyah County, Oklahoma
Census-designated places in Oklahoma
Fort Smith metropolitan area
Oklahoma populated places on the Arkansas River